Twelve Songs of Christmas is an album by Jim Reeves released in the US in 1963. It was Reeves' first and only Christmas-themed release. The album was released by  RCA Victor  in stereo (LSP-2758) and mono (LPM-2758) respectively. The album was first released in South Africa as Merry Christmas from Jim Reeves as an eleven-track album. "Silver Bells" was recorded in July 1963 to create the twelve track US album released in 1963.  The album charted for 10 weeks peaking at #15 on Billboards Christmas Records album chart.

Track listing

Side one
"Jingle Bells" (James Pierpont) – 1:46 
"Blue Christmas" (Billy Hayes, Jay W. Johnson) – 3:00
"Señor Santa Claus" (Lawton Williams) – 2:27
"An Old Christmas Card" (Vaughn Horton) – 2:32
"The Merry Christmas Polka" (Willie Phelps) – 2:25
"White Christmas" (Irving Berlin) – 2:27

Side two
"Silver Bells" (Ray Evans, Jay Livingston) – 2:00
"C-H-R-I-S-T-M-A-S" (Eddy Arnold, Jenny Lou Carson) – 1:51
"O Little Town of Bethlehem" (Phillips Brooks, Lewis Redner) – 3:29
"Mary's Boy Child" (Jester Hairston) – 2:42
"Oh Come All Ye Faithful (Adeste Fideles)" (Traditional) – 2:34
"Silent Night" (Franz Xaver Gruber, Joseph Mohr) – 2:34

2001 ReissueTwelve Songs of Christmas''''' was released on CD in 2001 on the BMG Special Products label.

Charts

Certifications

References

External links

Jim Reeves recorded a Christmas album 50 years ago

1963 Christmas albums
Jim Reeves albums
Christmas albums by American artists
RCA Records Christmas albums
Albums produced by Chet Atkins
Country Christmas albums